Lig Jou Stem Op (Afrikaans for "Lift Up Your Voice") is the second studio christian album release by the pop/opera vocal quartet group Romanz. The album was released on November 8, 2013. It is the last project for the band before disbanding in 2014.

Track listing

Charts

Weekly charts

References 

2013 albums
Romanz albums
Gospel albums by South African artists
Afrikaans albums